Daxing is a town under the administration of Changling County, Jilin, China. , it had 15 villages under its administration.

References 

Township-level divisions of Jilin
Changling County